p97 is an enzyme that in humans is encoded by the VCP gene.

P97 may also refer to:
 , a patrol boat of the Royal Australian Navy
 Papyrus 97, a biblical manuscript
 Ruger P97, a pistol
 P97, a state regional road in Latvia